Endomucin is a protein that in humans is encoded by the EMCN gene. Endomucin is a marker for endothelial cells and hematopoietic stem cells.

Function 

EMCN is a mucin-like sialoglycoprotein that interferes with the assembly of focal adhesion complexes and inhibits interaction between cells and the extracellular matrix.

References

Further reading 

 
 
 
 
 
 
 
 </ref>